1 Aurigae is the original name for a star now in the constellation Perseus. It was the first entry in John Flamsteed's catalogue of stars in Auriga. When Eugène Joseph Delporte drew up simplified boundaries for the constellations on behalf of the International Astronomical Union in 1930, 1 Aurigae ended up over the border in Perseus. To avoid confusion, the star may instead be referred to by its Harvard Revised catalogue number, HR 1533.

It is visible to the naked eye as a faint, orange-hued star with an apparent visual magnitude of 4.89. 1 Aurigae is moving closer to the Earth with a heliocentric radial velocity of −25 km/s.

This is a possible binary star system, based upon the status of the visible component as a mild barium star. It is 3.9 billion years old with 1.49 times the mass of the Sun and around 44 times the Sun's radius. This star is radiating 561 times the luminosity of the Sun from its enlarged photosphere at an effective temperature of 4,102 K. The suspected companion star should be a white dwarf that previously transferred s-process elements to the visible member.

References

Aurigae, 01
Barium stars
Auriga (constellation)
Perseus (constellation)
Durchmusterung objects
Aurigae, 01
030504
022453
1533